This list comprises all players who have participated in at least one league match for Charlotte Independence since the team's first USL season in 2015.

A "†" denotes players who only appeared in a single match.

A
 Carlos Alvarez

B
 Dominique Badji
 Charlie Bales †
 John Berner
 Michael Bustamante

C
 Caleb Calvert
 Francisco Córdoba †
 Raphael Cox

D
 Paolo DelPiccolo
 Haminu Draman
 Bilal Duckett

E
 Charles Eloundou
 Chris Estridge

F
 Ryan Finley

G
 Hunter Gilstrap

H
 Marlon Hairston
 Jorge Herrera

J
 Daniel Jackson
 Mechack Jérôme

K
 Henry Kalungi
 Mamadou Kansaye

L
 Matt Lampson
 Michael Lisch

M
 Alex Martínez
 Enzo Martínez
 Jack Metcalf

N
 Ben Newnam

R
 Diego Restrepo †
 Andrew Ribeiro

S
 Patrick Slogic

T
 Jack Thompson

Z
 Tomasz Zahorski

External links

Charlotte Independence
 
Association football player non-biographical articles